William Camp Street (August 7, 1816 – April 7, 1893) was a member of the Connecticut Senate representing the 12th District from 1867 to 1869 and a member of the Connecticut House of Representatives representing Norwalk from 1863 to 1865. He served as Warden of the Borough of Norwalk, Connecticut in 1860.

He was the son of William Jarvis Street and Sarah Camp. His father had owned a hardware business in Norwalk, and also served as Warden of the Borough of Norwalk. For some time, he was a business partner with William H. Smith, who also served as warden of Norwalk.

In 1849, he was one of the original incorporators of the Norwalk Savings Society.

In 1860, he was Warden of the Borough of Norwalk.

On October 26, 1876, he was elected to the board of directors of the Norwalk and Danbury Railroad.

In 1878, he was on the board of directors of the Norwalk Fire Insurance Company.

References

1816 births
1893 deaths
Republican Party Connecticut state senators
Hardware merchants
Mayors of Norwalk, Connecticut
Republican Party members of the Connecticut House of Representatives
19th-century American politicians